Donald Joseph Oakes (8 October 1928 – 13 June 1977) was an English professional footballer who played as a left half.

Early and personal life
Oakes was born in Rhyl, Wales. His father Alfred was also a professional footballer.

Career
After playing in Bristol for Downend ATC, Oakes joined Arsenal as an amateur in December 1945, before turning professional seven months later.

He made 11 appearances in the Football League, scoring once, and scored eight goals in 158 Football Combination appearances.

References

1928 births
1977 deaths
English footballers
Arsenal F.C. players
English Football League players
Association football wing halves